Football in Scotland is a popular professional sport. Founded in 1873, Scotland has the second oldest national football association in the world. The national cup competition, the Scottish Cup, was started in the 1873–74 season. Its trophy is the oldest national sporting trophy in the world. A Scottish football league system was first instituted in 1890, with the creation of the Scottish Football League. A second national cup competition, the Scottish League Cup, was created in the 1946–47 season. This page details the team and individual records set in these competitions.

League competitions

Team records
Titles

Most top-flight league titles: 55, Rangers
Most consecutive league titles:  9, joint record:
 Celtic (1965–66 to 1973–74)
 Rangers (1988–89 to 1996–97)
 Celtic (2011–12 to 2019–20
Longest gap between title wins: 61 years, Hearts (1897 to 1958)
Top-flight appearances
Most appearances: 125 completed seasons, Celtic (1890–present)
Largest victories
Largest top flight home win: 11–0, Celtic v Dundee, 26 October 1895
Largest top flight away win: 1–11, Airdrieonians v Hibernian, 24 October 1959

Streaks
Longest top flight unbeaten run: 62 games, Celtic (20 November 1915 – 21 April 1917)
Longest top flight unbeaten run (games in all national competitions): 69 games (56 in the league), Celtic (15 May 2016 – 13 December 2017) 

Most consecutive top flight wins: 25, Celtic (2003–04)

Unbeaten league season:
Celtic P18 W15 D3 L0, 1897–98
Rangers P18 W18 D0 L0, 1898–99
Celtic P38 W34 D4 L0 2016–17
Rangers P38 W32 D6 L0 2020–21

Attendances
Highest attendance: 118,567 - Rangers v Celtic at Ibrox Park, 2 January 1939

Individual

Goals
Most top flight goals in a career: 410, Jimmy McGrory (Celtic 397, Clydebank 13)
Most top flight goals in a season: 52, Willie MacFadyen (Motherwell, 1931–32)
Most top flight goals in a game: 8, Jimmy McGrory (Celtic 9 Dunfermline Athletic 0, 14 January 1928)
Most top flight hat-tricks: 48, Jimmy McGrory

Appearances
Most top flight appearances: 626, Bob Ferrier (Motherwell)
Most consecutive appearances with a goal scored: 14, Evelyn Morrison (Falkirk, 1928–29)

Goalkeepers
Longest consecutive period of time without conceding a goal:  1,256 minutes, Fraser Forster (Celtic, 2013–14)

Titles
Most league title wins by a manager 18, Bill Struth (Rangers)
Most league title wins by a player 13, Sandy Archibald (Rangers)

Scottish Cup

Team records

Most final wins: 40, Celtic
Most consecutive final wins: 4, Celtic (2016–17, 2017–18, 2018–19, 2019–20)
Most final appearances: 59, Celtic (includes cancelled 1909 fixture)
Most consecutive final defeats: 3, Vale of Leven (1882–83 – 1884–85)
Most consecutive final appearances: 8, Rangers (1975–76 – 1982–83)
Longest gap between final wins: 114 years, Hibernian (1901–02 – 2015–16)
Most final appearances without winning: 2, Hamilton Academical (1910–11, 1934–35)
Most final appearances without defeat: 2, St Johnstone 
Longest winning streak in finals: 14, Rangers (1929–30, 1931–32, 1933–34, 1934–35, 1935–36, 1947–48, 1948–49, 1949–50, 1952–53, 1959–60, 1961–62, 1962–63, 1963–64, 1965–66)
Longest losing streak in finals: 10, Hibernian (1913–14, 1922–23, 1923–24, 1946–47, 1957–58, 1971–72, 1978–79, 2000–01, 2011–12, 2012–13) 
Biggest final wins: 5 goals, joint record:
Renton 6–1 Cambuslang, (1887–88)
Rangers 5–0 St Mirren, (1933–34)
Celtic 6–1 Hibernian, (1971–72)
Most goals in a final: 7:
Renton 6–1 Cambuslang, (1887–88)
Celtic 4–3 Queen's Park, (1899–1900)
Hearts 4–3 Celtic, (1900–01)
Celtic 6–1 Hibernian (1971–72)
Motherwell 4–3 Dundee United (1990–91)
Most goals by a runner-up: 3:
Queen's Park: Lost 3–4 against Celtic (1899–1900)
Celtic: Lost 3–4 against Hearts (1900–01)
Dundee United: Lost 3–4 against Motherwell (1990–91)
Hearts: Lost on penalties against Celtic after the game finished 3–3 (aet) (2019–20)
Most final losses:18, joint record: Celtic and Rangers (excludes cancelled 1909 fixture)
Most common pairing in the final: 15, Celtic v Rangers (7 wins each, 1908–09 was withheld)

Attendances
Highest attendance: 146,433, Celtic v Aberdeen at Hampden Park, 24 April 1937 (1937 Scottish Cup Final)

Individual

Most cup final wins by manager: 14, Willie Maley (Celtic)
Most cup final wins by player 8, Bobby Lennox (Celtic)
Most overall goals: Jimmy McGrory 77 goals (Celtic 74, Clydebank 3)
Most Scottish Cup goals in a match: John Petrie 13 (Arbroath 36, Bon Accord 0, 12 September 1885)

Scottish League Cup

Team records

Most final wins: 27, Rangers
Most consecutive final wins: 5, Celtic (1965–66 – 1969–70)
Most final appearances: 36, joint record: Celtic and Rangers
Most consecutive final defeats: 4, Celtic (1970–71 – 1973–74)
Most consecutive final appearances: 14, Celtic (1964–65 – 1977–78)
Most final appearances without winning: 3, Dunfermline Athletic  (1949–50, 1991–92, 2005–06)
Most final appearances without losing: 3, East Fife (1947–48, 1949–50, 1953–54)
Longest gap between final wins: 21 years, Aberdeen (1955–56  – 1976–77)
Longest winning streak in finals: 9, Rangers (1990–91, 1992–93, 1993–94, 1996–97, 1998–99, 2001–02, 2002–03, 2004–05, 2007–08)
Longest losing streak in finals: 5, joint record: 
Kilmarnock (1952–53, 1960–61, 1962–63, 2000–01, 2006–07), 
Dundee United (1981–82, 1984–85, 1997–98, 2007–08, 2014–15) 
Biggest final win: 6 goals: 
Celtic 7–1 Rangers, (1957–58)
Most goals in a final: 9:
Celtic 6–3 Hibernian, (1974–75)
Most goals by a runner-up: 3:
Dundee: Lost 3–5 against Celtic (1967–68)
Hibernian: Lost 3–6 against Celtic (1974–75)
Aberdeen: Drew 3–3 against Rangers but lost on penalties (1987–88)
Hearts: Lost 3–4 against Rangers (1996–97)
Most final losses: 15, Celtic
Most common pairing in the final: 16, Celtic v Rangers (9 Rangers wins, 7 Celtic wins)

Attendances
Highest attendance: 107,609, Celtic v Rangers at Hampden Park, 25 October 1965 (1965–66)

Individual
Most cup final wins by manager: 6, Scot Symon (East Fife and Rangers), Jock Stein (Celtic) and Walter Smith (Rangers)
Most overall goals: Joe Harper 74 goals (Aberdeen 51, Hibernian 16, Morton 7)

Transfers

Record transfer fees paid

Record transfer fees received

Most successful clubs by titles

References

External links

Records
Football in Scotland
Scottish football club statistics